Xylorycta micracma is a moth in the family Xyloryctidae. It was described by Edward Meyrick in 1890. It is found in Australia, where it has been recorded from New South Wales, Queensland and Tasmania.

The wingspan is 17–18 mm. The forewings are silvery white with the costal edge finely dark fuscous towards the base. The hindwings are grey.

References

Xylorycta
Moths described in 1890